Nero d'Avola ('Black of Avola' in Italian) is "the most important red wine grape in Sicily" and is one of Italy's most important indigenous varieties. It is named after Avola in the far south of Sicily, and its wines are compared to New World Shirazes, with sweet tannins and plum or peppery flavours. It also contributes to Marsala Rubino blends.

History
"The Black Grape of Avola" appears to have been selected by growers near Avola (a small town in south east Sicily) several hundred years ago. Initially, it was confined to the southern tip of the island but more recently has spread throughout the island.

Viticulture

The vine likes hot and relatively dry climates. 
The districts around Noto (above all Buonivini) and Pachino in the south of the province of Siracusa are reputed for the quality of their Nero d'Avola wines. 
The first American producer of Nero d'Avola is Chiarito Vineyards in Ukiah, California (Mendocino County).
Nero d'Avola is also cultivated in Australia, particularly in the hot Riverland and Sunraysia areas where winemakers are producing light, juicy, fragrant wines (see Amato Vino, Chalmers Wines). The variety is also found in Malta, Turkey and recently in South Africa too.

Sensory properties
Colour: cherry or ruby red.
Perfume: typically winy, fruity, strongly reminiscent of blackberries.
Flavour: dry, slightly acidic, rounded, warm and full-bodied.
Serving temperature: ambient.

References

External links
Sicily Wine website

Red wine grape varieties
Wine grapes of Italy
Crops originating from Europe